Isidora Zegers Montenegro (also known as Isidora Zegers de Huneeus or Isidora Zegers; 1 January 1803 – 14 July 1869) was a Spanish musician and composer. She is known for her contributions to Chilean culture during the 19th century.

Biography
Isidora Zegers was born in Madrid, Spain. She studied voice, harp, guitar, piano and composition in Paris, France, then moved to Chile in 1823 with her father, who had been hired by the Ministry of Foreign Affairs.

Zegers married twice. In 1826, she married Colonel William Vic Tupper, who died in the Battle of Lircay. In 1835, she married Jorge Huneeus. She had two children from her marriages, including Chilean lawyer and politician Jorge Huneeus Zegers (1835–1889).

In 1852, Zegers was named honorary president of the National Academy of Music. In 1826, she founded the Philharmonic Society of Santiago. In addition, she contributed to charities as a singer and organizer of musical events.

Because of a painful illness, she moved to the city of Copiapó in 1862, seeking a better climate for her health.

Works
Isidora Zegers's compositions are for voice and piano or piano solo, mostly dating from her years in Paris and some written in French. She completed five compositions during her years in Chile. Selected works include:

 Figure de Trenis 
 La Bedlam 
 La Camilla 
 La Mercedes y Le Calif de Bagdad
 Valze per Maximino
 Romance 
 Les Regrets d'une bergère 
 La Coquette fixée 
 La Absence y les tombeau violés

Isidora Zegers y su tiempo

References

1803 births
1869 deaths
19th-century classical composers
19th-century women composers
Women classical composers
Spanish emigrants to Chile
Spanish women classical composers
Spanish Romantic composers